Hasso Krull (born 1964 in Tallinn) is an Estonian poet, literary and cultural critic, and translator. 
Krull's main points of focus in his work have been postmodernism and post-structuralism.
His topics include history, philosophy, literature, and translation.

In 1990 Krull began teaching at the Estonian Institute of Humanities in literary and cultural theory. In 2001 he co-founded Ninniku (poetry in translation online periodical) which led to the book series Ninniju Raamatukogu. He has translated works of various poets including: Sujata Bhatt, André Breton, Allen Ginsberg, Tapani Kinnunen, Pablo Neruda, Sylvia Plath, Michael Ondaatje and Paul Valéry. He is a lecturer at the University of Tallinn.

Some of the literary endeavors Krull has been involved in include: Luuletused 1987–1991 (Poems 1987–1991); Jazz, Kaalud (in conjunction with Toomas Kalve photographer), Millimallikas (Medusa, 2000) and Paljusus ja ainulisus (Plurality and Singularity, 2009). His own poetry has been translated into: Catalan Dutch, English, Finnish, French, Galician, German, Latvian, Russian, Slovak, Slovenian, Spanish and Swedish.

Awards 
Krull is the recipient of the following awards:

 University of Tallinn's Teaching Award (2007)
 Annual Prize (1998, 2007) of the Cultural Endowment of Estonia
 Baltic Assembly Prize for Literature (2005)
 Annual Prize for the Cultural Endowment of Estonia for Poetry (2002, 2010) 
 Order of the White Star, Medal Class (2001)

References 

1964 births
Living people
Estonian male poets
Estonian translators
20th-century Estonian poets
21st-century Estonian poets
21st-century Estonian educators
Tallinn University alumni
Academic staff of Tallinn University
Recipients of the Order of the White Star, Medal Class
Writers from Tallinn